Expensive Typewriter was a pioneering text editor program that ran on the DEC PDP-1 computer which had been delivered to MIT in the early 1960s.

Description
Since the program could drive an IBM Selectric typewriter (a letter-quality printer), it may be considered the first word processing software.  It was written and improved between 1961 and 1962 by Steve Piner and L. Peter Deutsch. In the spirit of an earlier editor program, named "Colossal Typewriter", it was called "Expensive Typewriter" because at that time the PDP-1 cost a lot of money (approximately ) as compared to a conventional manual typewriter.

References

See also 
 PDP-1
 Expensive Desk Calculator
 Expensive Planetarium
 Expensive Tape Recorder
 Text Editor and Corrector
 RUNOFF
 TJ-2

Word processors
History of software